Jassim Karim Kuraishi (born 14 August 1938) is an Iraqi sprinter. He competed in the men's 200 metres and men's 4 × 100 metres relay at the 1964 Summer Olympics.

References

External links
 

1938 births
Living people
Athletes (track and field) at the 1960 Summer Olympics
Athletes (track and field) at the 1964 Summer Olympics
Iraqi male sprinters
Olympic athletes of Iraq
Place of birth missing (living people)